Kashkandyow is a village in Wakhan District, Badakhshan Province in north-eastern Afghanistan.

References 

Populated places in Wakhan District
Wakhan